The Baltimore Community Foundation (BCF) is a community foundation created by and for the people of Baltimore to serve the current and future needs of the Baltimore region.

The foundation distributed $30.7 million in 2020 to more than 1,500 nonprofit organizations in the Baltimore region and beyond. It comprises more than 850 different charitable funds created by individuals, families, and corporations, totaling more than $240 million in assets. In addition to managing donor-advised funds, BCF makes grants and impact investments, and advocates for policies to improve public education and quality of life in Baltimore neighborhoods. Its role as an advocate was highlighted in FSG Social Impact Advisors’ 2009 report, Raising Money While Raising Hell.

History 
In 1972, leaders of Baltimore's five major banks joined to establish the Community Foundation of the Greater Baltimore Area. Inspired by the success of the nation's first community foundation in Cleveland, Ohio, and a rapidly growing network of community foundations nationwide. Co-founder Robert Levi of Mercantile-Safe Deposit and Trust,  the fledgling organization's first chairman, felt strongly that Baltimore needed “a philanthropic organization that was a gathering of all people—no color line, no religious affiliation, no special cause.”

Governance 
BCF is governed by a 30-member board of trustees, selected to represent diverse community interests. Its staff includes professionals in community investment, donor services, development, finance and administration, and communications.

Initiatives 
A number of key initiatives of the Baltimore Community Foundation are:
 Donor Services, providing customized charitable giving guidance for individual, family, corporate and public entities.
Grantmaking focused on strengthening schools and neighborhoods.
Impact Investing in projects that provide a financial return and social and economic benefits.
Advocacy for equity in public education including the Blueprint for Maryland's Future. BCF CEO Dr. Shanaysha Sauls was appointed to chair the Blueprint Accountability and Implementation Board nominating committee that will oversee the law's roll-out.
Special Initiatives
Central Maryland Transportation Alliance is a coalition of Greater Baltimore's business, environmental and community leaders dedicated to improving travel efficiency in Central Maryland.

References 

Community foundations based in the United States
Non-profit organizations based in Maryland
Organizations based in Baltimore
1972 establishments in Maryland